Dmitri Tarasov may refer to:
 Dmitri Tarasov (footballer) (born 1987), Russian footballer
 Dmitri Tarasov (ice hockey) (born 1979), Russia ice hockey player
 Dmitri Tarasov (screenwriter), Soviet screenwriter of The Liberated Earth